Friday Night is Music Night (currently known as Sunday Night is Music Night) is a long-running live BBC radio concert programme featuring the BBC Concert Orchestra, broadcast on the BBC Light Programme and its successor BBC Radio 2 since 1953. The programme is the world's longest-running live orchestral music radio programme (although there were no new editions during the first part of the Coronavirus pandemic in 2020).

The programme features many types of music, including classical music, light music, film music, theatre music, songs from the musicals, and opera and operetta. It is also notable for its arrangements of popular standards swing, jazz, and folksongs. One of its biggest appeals is its unpredictable playlist, which is left unrevealed until broadcast.

The programme usually features guest artists between the orchestral pieces, who sing with full orchestral accompaniment. Occasionally, artists such as Donny Osmond and Alanis Morissette perform in the larger venues. The programme also showpieces certain sections of the orchestra and features guest instrumentalists, for example the BBC Big Band.

The show is currently executive produced by Anthony Cherry, who has worked at the BBC for 43 years.

Format
Friday Night Is Music Night traditionally begins with the orchestra playing the first bars of an adapted version of Charles Williams's High Adventure. After the fanfare, the compère (today usually Paul Gambaccini, or Russell Davies. but formerly Kenneth Alwyn, Richard Baker, Aled Jones, Clare Teal, Ken Bruce, Jimmy Kingsbury, Robin Boyle or Brian Kay) gives a summary of the programme, before reciting the slogan of the title. This happens again at the close of the programme, with the announcer usually ending on "I hope that once again we have proved that Friday Night is Music Night"

It is broadcast live from many theatres and concert halls throughout the UK, although regularly from the Mermaid Theatre in London or the Watford Colosseum, or the Hackney Empire. The show is not broadcast live every week, but instead previous shows are repeated later in the year when the orchestra is on tour.

History
The programme has been running since 1953, first on the BBC Light Programme and now on its successor, BBC Radio 2, making it the world's longest-running live orchestral music radio programmes. Many attribute the programme's format to the composer and conductor Sidney Torch. In particular, it is notable for now being one of the few programmes to feature light music on Radio 2.

From the early 1970s onwards it was fronted by Robin Boyle, who, it was later said, "came to be the linchpin of the programme".

In 2005, the programme was televised for the first time on BBC Four as part of a 1940s' and 1950s' theme night, with a playlist concentrating on classic light music by composers such as Eric Coates, Trevor Duncan, Ronald Binge and Leroy Anderson. The compère was actor and comedian Roy Hudd. On Friday 19 March 2010, the programme was broadcast from the BBC Television Centre in Shepherd's Bush for the first time. Singers John Lawrenson and Cynthia Glover were for many years the programme's resident musical artists.

Since April 2020, due to the Covid-19 pandemic, repeats of the programme have been broadcast on Sunday nights between 7pm and 9pm, under the title of Sunday Night is Music Night, as no new editions could be recorded during the first stages of the pandemic. There have been a few new editions broadcast since August of 2021 (or 2020, if you count the Great Northern Playlist edition, which is treated as part of the series by the BBC but differed from the usual format in that it featured remotely recorded performances by the BBC Philharmonic and was presented from a studio as a more conventional music show, albeit one with linkups to BBC Local Radio stations in the North of England because of the theme, rather than the traditional concert).

References

External links

BBC Concert Orchestra website
Biography of BBC Concert Orchestra

BBC Radio 2 programmes
BBC Light Programme programmes
British music radio programmes
1953 radio programme debuts
British classical music radio programmes
British jazz radio programs